The Thirteen Buddhas of Chichibu（秩父十三仏霊場, Chichibu jūsan butsu reijō）are a group of 13 Buddhist sacred sites in Saitama Prefecture, Japan. (  was an old province of Japan in the area that is today the western part of Saitama Prefecture.) The temples are dedicated to the Thirteen Buddhas.

Directory

See also
 Thirteen Buddhas

References

External links 
Official Website listing

Buddhist temples in Saitama Prefecture
Buddhist pilgrimage sites in Japan